Petralica is a village in the municipality of Rankovce, North Macedonia.

Demographics
According to the 2002 census, the village had a total of 669 inhabitants. Ethnic groups in the village include:

Macedonians 667
Serbs 1
Others 1

References

Villages in Rankovce Municipality